Pyroprocessing (from Greek Πυρος = fire) is a process in which materials are subjected to high temperatures (typically over 800 °C) in order to bring about a chemical or physical change.  Pyroprocessing includes such terms as ore-roasting, calcination and sintering.  Equipment for pyroprocessing includes kilns, electric arc furnaces and reverberatory furnaces.

Cement manufacturing is a very common example of pyroprocessing. The raw material mix (raw meal) is fed to a kiln where pyroprocessing takes place. As with most industries, pyroprocessing is the most energy-intensive part of the industrial process.

Recycling used nuclear fuel through pyroprocessing

Argonne National Laboratory pioneered the development of pyrochemical processing, or pyroprocessing, a high-temperature method of recycling reactor waste into fuel, demonstrating it paired with the EBR-II and then proposed commercializing it in the Integral Fast Reactor. The latter was cancelled by the Clinton Administration in 1994. In 2016, Argonne National Laboratory researchers are developing and refining several pyroprocessing technologies for both light water and fast reactors, with most based on electrorefining rather than conventional wet-chemical/PUREX, to improve the technologies’ commercial viability by increasing their process efficiency and scalability.

Animations of the processing technology are also available.

Pyroprocessing of nuclear fuel rods, as an alternative to nuclear reprocessing, only attempts to combine separated plutonium with other, such as neptunium, americium, or curium. Theoretically, you could still reuse mixed, pyroprocessed plutonium to generate nuclear power, but it wouldn’t be pure enough for other uses.
	
In South Korea due to the historical Section 123 Agreement between ROK and the U.S, neither enrichment nor PUREX related reprocessing were permitted, with researchers therefore increasingly viewing the "proliferation resistant" pyroprocessing cycle, as the solution for the nation's growing spent fuel inventory, in 2017 forming a collaboration with the U.S and Japan to advance the economics of the process. In 2019, proponents of molten salt reactor (MSR) fuel cycles, frequently argue pairing the uncommercialized MSR with the pyroprocessing fuel cycle, as the MSR fuel is already in molten salt form, eliminating two process conversion steps, that of to-and-from metallic fuel, that both the commercially proposed IFR would have required and its antecedent physically demonstrated, when pyroprocessing was fielded in the EBR-II.

References

Chemical processes